The Peterstown House is a historic building located in Waterloo, Illinois. The saltbox building was constructed in the mid-1830s; an addition was placed on its north side around the 1860s. Emory Peter Rogers, for whom the house and surrounding neighborhood were named, was the first owner of the building. The building served as an inn and stagecoach stop along the Kaskaskia-Cahokia Trail, which was the first road in Illinois. The stagecoach route connected the French settlements at Kaskaskia and Cahokia. The Peterstown House is the only intact inn which still stands along the trail; while another building in Waterloo once served as an inn on the trail, it has been extensively remodeled. In the late nineteenth century, the Peterstown House became a local social hall.

The building was placed on the National Register of Historic Places on November 16, 1977.

References

Hotel buildings on the National Register of Historic Places in Illinois
Waterloo, Illinois
Buildings and structures in Monroe County, Illinois
National Register of Historic Places in Monroe County, Illinois